Triacastela is a municipality in the province of Lugo, Galicia, Spain. It gets its name from the three castles that once stood here, none of which exist today. Norman (Viking) invaders in 968 A.D. pillaged here, eventually to be defeated at Cebreiro pass and driven off. They probably destroyed all three castles at that time. 
It is along the French Way route of the Camino de Santiago (The Way of St. James), and many of the pilgrims stop in the town's albergues and restaurants.

References

Municipalities in the Province of Lugo
Camino de Santiago